Condor is the common name for two species of birds.

Condor, CONDOR, El Condor, or The Condor may also refer to:

Places 
 Condor, Rio Grande do Sul, Brazil, a municipality
 Condor, Alberta, Canada, a hamlet
 Cerro El Cóndor, a stratovolcano in Argentina
 Condor Peninsula, Palmer Land, Antarctica
 Cordillera del Cóndor, a mountain range in the Andes on the border between Ecuador and Peru
 El Cóndor (Jujuy), Argentina, a town and municipality
 Condor (mountain), in the Andes in Peru

People
 Condor of Cornwall, earl of Cornwall
 Lana Condor (born 1997), American actress
 Sam Condor, Kittitian politician and the former Deputy Prime Minister of Saint Kitts and Nevis
 Condor Laucke (1914-1993), Australian politician
 Mat Hoffman (born 1972), American BMX rider nicknamed "The Condor"
 Kevin Mitnick (born 1963), American computer security consultant, author, and hacker who uses the handle, "The Condor"
 Carlos Manuel Hoo Ramírez (born 1978), alias El Cóndor, imprisoned high-ranking member of the Sinaloa Cartel drug trafficking organization
 Alfred Williams (born 1968), American retired National Football League player nicknamed "The Condor"

Arts, entertainment, and media

Fictional characters
 Black Condor, a DC Comics character
Condor (comics), a Marvel Comics character
 Condor, a fictional starship featured in the 1964 novel The Invincible by Stanislaw Lem
 Captain Condor, a character in Lion, a weekly British comics periodical (1952-1974)

Films
 El Condor (film), a 1970 Western starring Jim Brown and Lee Van Cleef
 The Condor (film), a 2007 animated superhero film about a character created by Stan Lee

Periodicals
 Cóndor (newspaper), a German-language newspaper published in Chile
 El Cóndor (newspaper), a Chilean newspaper published in Santa Cruz, Colchagua, since 1917
 The Condor, now Ornithological Applications, a quarterly scientific journal covering ornithology

Other uses in arts, entertainment, and media
 Condor, a 1984 novel by Graham Masterton
 Condor (TV series), a television series based on the 1975 film Three Days of the Condor
 The Condor (album), a 1986 album by saxophonist Steve Lacy

Attractions and rides
 Condor (ride), an amusement ride
 El Condor (roller coaster), at Walibi Holland in the Netherlands

Brands and enterprises
 Condor Club, an early strip club in San Francisco, California, that helped set precedent for the legality of nude dancing
 Condor Cycles, a bicycle manufacturer based in London, England
 Condor Films, a film and TV production company based in Zurich, Switzerland
 Stoeger Condor, a type of shotgun
 Condor Electronics, an electronics and home appliances manufacturer based in Algiers, Algeria.

Computing and technology 
 Condor High-Throughput Computing System, a framework for distributed computing
 CONDOR secure cell phone, a prototype secure CDMA phone by Qualcomm
 Moto E (1st generation), an Android smartphone made by Motorola with the codename Condor

Military

Aviation 
 Condor, a version of the BQM-147 Dragon unmanned aerial vehicle "navalized" for the United States Coast Guard
 AGM-53 Condor, a US Navy air-to-surface missile that did not enter service
 Amarah Air Base, a former Iraqi Air Force base captured by Coalition forces in 2003 and renamed Camp Condor
 Antonov An-124, a Ukrainian/Soviet transport aircraft (NATO reporting name "Condor")
 Boeing Condor, a test bed unmanned aerial vehicle
 Condor Group, a fleet of helicopters operated by the Mexico City's Federal District Secretariat of Public Security
 Curtiss B-2 Condor, a 1920s American bomber
 Curtiss T-32 Condor II, a 1930s American biplane bomber, transport, and civilian airliner
 Focke-Wulf Fw 200 Condor, a German aircraft used for long range maritime patrol and reconnaissance during World War II, derived from an airliner
 HMH-464, United States Marine Corps helicopter squadron known as the Condors
 Schweizer RU-38 Twin Condor, a covert reconnaissance aircraft

Ships 
 Condor-class gunvessel, a Royal Navy class of four gunvessels built between 1876 and 1877
 Condor-class sloop, a Royal Navy class of six sloops built between 1898 and 1900
 , two Royal Navy ships and a former Royal Naval Air Station
 , an Imperial German Navy unprotected cruiser
 , three US Navy minesweepers

Other uses in military 
 Condor (APC), a German armoured personnel carrier, best known for its use by Malaysian forces
 Condor (Argentine missile), a long-range missile developed by Argentina
 Condor A350, a Swiss military motorcycle
 Condor Legion, a Nazi military unit which fought on the Nationalist side during the Spanish Civil War
 Operation Condor (disambiguation), the codename of a number of military operations
 RM Condor, the home base of 45 Commando, Royal Marines, situated in Arbroath on the east coast of Scotland

Sports
 Condor (golf), a score of four under par on any given hole in the sport of golf
 Bakersfield Condors (1998–2015), a defunct minor-league ice hockey team based in California
 Bakersfield Condors (AHL), a minor-league ice hockey team based in California that plays in the American Hockey League
 Club El Condor, ancestor of Bogotá F.C., a Colombian football club
 Jonquière Condors, a former minor pro ice hockey team based in Jonquière, Quebec, Canada
 Pittsburgh Condors, a former American Basketball Association team

Transportation

Air
 ADI Condor, an American motor glider
 Aero Condor, an airline based in Lima, Peru
 Condor (airline), a German airline
 Davis-Costin Condor, an all-wood UK sailplane first flown in 1953
 Druine Condor, a French 1950s light aircraft
 El Condor Airport, a former airstrip near El Condor, Tarija, Bolivia
 FMA IA 36 Cóndor, a 1950s projected Argentine jet airliner
 Rolls-Royce Condor, an aircraft piston engine
 Schleicher Condor, a German glider
 Seahawk Condor, an ultralight aircraft
 Southern Condor, an American powered parachute / ultralight aircraft
 TL Ultralight Condor, an ultralight aircraft built in the Czech Republic since the mid-1990s
 Wills Wing Condor, an American hang glider design

Land 
 Condor, an express freight service operated by British Rail between London and Glasgow between 1959 and 1965
 Cóndor station, a railway station in Bolivia
 Dennis Dragon (also sold as the Dennis Condor), a double-decker bus manufactured between 1982 and 1999
 UD Condor, a line of medium-duty commercial vehicles introduced in 1975
 Toyota Kijang, a series of pickup trucks and minivans, sold as the Toyota Condor in South Africa

Sea 
 Condor (yacht), a racing yacht built in 1981
 Condor Ferries, a ferry company providing service between the Channel Islands, the United Kingdom and France
 Condor of Bermuda, a maxi yacht, earlier named Condor and Heath's Condor
 , captured and sunk by Germany in 1914
 , in service from 1927 to 1940

Other uses
 Comet Nucleus Dust and Organics Return (CONDOR), a spacecraft mission concept to retrieve a sample from comet 67P/Churyumov–Gerasimenko
 Condor (options), an options trading strategy in finance
 Condor Sea Scouts, a Scout Troop established in Chua Chu Kang Secondary School

See also
 HTCondor, an open-source high-throughput computing software framework

Lists of people by nickname